is an underground metro station located in Tempaku-ku, Nagoya, Aichi Prefecture, Japan, operated by the Nagoya Municipal Subway's Tsurumai Line. It provides access to the Tempaku campus, the main campus, of Meijo University.

History
Shiogama-guchi Station was opened on 1 October 1978.

Lines
The station is served by the Tsurumai Line, is numbered T16, and is located 16.4 rail kilometers from the terminus of the line at Kami-Otai Station.

Layout
Shiogama-guchi Station has one underground island platform.

Platforms

Surroundings
Meijo University Tempaku Campus

References

External links

 Shiogama-guchi Station official web site 

Railway stations in Japan opened in 1978
Railway stations in Aichi Prefecture